Baron Curzon can refer to:

 Baron Curzon of Penn, an 18th-century title in the peerage of Great Britain
 Baron Curzon of Kedleston, a 19th-century title in the peerage of Ireland

Curzon family